Darius Martin Clarke Vassell (born 13 June 1980) is an English former professional footballer who played as a forward for Aston Villa, Manchester City, Ankaragücü and Leicester City.

Vassell began his career at his home town club Aston Villa in the Premier League, being developed by their academy and making his first team debut in 1998. He was sold for £2 million in 2005 to another Premier League club, Manchester City, staying for four seasons before being released in 2009, moving abroad to Turkey for a season to play for the Süper Lig team Ankaragücü. In October 2010 he was brought back to England by his former international manager Sven-Göran Eriksson to play for the Championship side Leicester City.

Under Eriksson with England, Vassell scored six goals from 22 international caps awarded between 2002 and 2004, including appearances at the 2002 FIFA World Cup in South Korea and Japan, and UEFA Euro 2004 in Portugal.

Club career

Early career
Vassell was born in Birmingham, West Midlands. He was raised in the Gravelly Hill area of Birmingham and went to the Yenton Primary School in Erdington and John Willmott School, in Falcon Lodge, Sutton Coldfield. He first played football with local junior team Romulus in the Birmingham Boys League scoring a record of 46 in a season and 6 in 1 match. Following this he signed for the Aston Villa youth team.

Aston Villa
An Aston Villa fan, Vassell was taken on by the club's School of Excellence. While playing for the club's youth team Vassell set a club record by scoring 39 goals in a single season. He made his first team debut as a substitute in a 3–1 win against Middlesbrough in August 1998.

Vassell's best qualities were his speed and agility. Aston Villa fans lamented the fact that his best performances seem to come with England, where he has proved particularly useful as a "super sub", coming on for the last 15 to 20 minutes of a game to trouble a tired defence with his exceptional pace. One oddity of his career was that he had never finished on the losing side in a league game in which he had scored. This run ended on 22 April 2011 when he scored for Leicester City during the 3–2 defeat to Nottingham Forest.

Manchester City

Vassell was transferred to Manchester City in July 2005 for £2 million. During his first season for Manchester City, Vassell scored eight league goals in 35 appearances, forming an effective partnership with Andrew Cole. Additionally, he helped the Blues to an FA Cup Quarter Final, scoring two goals in his five cup games. He played part of the season with a hernia problem, which required surgery in the close season.

In the 2007–08 season, he was assigned the number 12, as teammate Elano took the number 11 shirt. He generally struggled to find his best form. In the latter half of the season, many of his appearances were as a wide midfielder, as manager Sven-Göran Eriksson adopted a defensive 4–5–1 formation. Vassell was linked with a move away from Eastlands, with Turkish runners-up Besiktas having a £1m bid rejected and linked to other clubs, including Premier League rivals Bolton Wanderers and newly promoted Derby County. Vassell scored his 50th Premier League goal on 10 February 2008, in the victory against local rivals Manchester United. Vassell only played 15 games in 2008–09 and was released at the end of the season as his contract expired.

Ankaragücü
In July 2009 Vassell signed for the Turkish side Ankaragücü.
Around 3,000 fans turned out and celebrated his arrival. He scored his first goal in the Turkish Süper Lig against Manisaspor in the second week of the season. He parted company with the club at the end of the 2009–10 season.

Leicester City
On 20 October 2010, Vassell signed for English side Leicester City on a two-year deal until the end of 2011–12 season, reuniting him with his former Manchester City and England manager Eriksson. He scored his first goal for Leicester in a 5–1 win over Doncaster Rovers on 11 December.

On 29 October 2011, he suffered a serious knee injury in a game against West Ham United which ruled him out for the rest of the season. The injury was a ruptured anterior cruciate ligament. Vassell left the club on 30 June after not being offered a new contract.

Vassell remained without a club until his retirement on 28 January 2016, at the age of 35.

International career
Vassell made his England debut on 13 February 2002, in a man of the match performance against Netherlands in a 1–1 draw. Fellow debutants in this game were Michael Ricketts and Wayne Bridge. He scored in the game with a 60th-minute bicycle kick to equalise. He was subsequently included in England's 2002 World Cup campaign. He played in three games, starting just one: against Sweden in England's opening group game.

Vassell missed in the penalty shoot-out in the quarter-finals of Euro 2004 against hosts Portugal. Coming on for the injured Wayne Rooney early on in the game, he missed England's last spot-kick in the penalty shoot-out, allowing Portugal goalkeeper Ricardo to knock England out of the tournament by scoring the final penalty. Vassell did not play for England again.

Personal life
Vassell was born to Jamaican parents and is a practising Christian. He credits his faith for his survival of a serious car accident. Vassell's cousin Isaac is also a footballer and plays for Cardiff City. He is married to Amani Rodriquez-Thomas, they have a daughter named Persia; Vassell's 2017 autobiography Road to Persia was titled for her. He is also a cousin of Kilmarnock F.C. forward Kyle Vassell.

Career statistics

Club

International

Scores and results list England's goal tally first, score column indicates score after each Vassell goal.

Honours
Aston Villa
 FA Cup: 2000 (runner-up)
 Intertoto Cup: 2001

References

External links

 
 
 
 England profile  at theFA

1980 births
English footballers
English people of Jamaican descent
English expatriate footballers
England youth international footballers
England under-21 international footballers
England international footballers
Association football wingers
Association football forwards
Association football utility players
Romulus F.C. players
Aston Villa F.C. players
Manchester City F.C. players
MKE Ankaragücü footballers
Leicester City F.C. players
Premier League players
English Football League players
Süper Lig players
2002 FIFA World Cup players
UEFA Euro 2004 players
Black British sportsmen
Expatriate footballers in Turkey
English expatriate sportspeople in Turkey
English Christians
Footballers from Birmingham, West Midlands
Living people